Winnipegoceras is an extinct nautiloid genus from the Ordovician belonging to the Order Discosorida.

Phylogeny
Winnipegoceras is included in the discosorid family Westonoceratidae and is derived from Westonoceras. Westonoceratidae have mostly medium to large, compressed, exogastric shells with moderately sized siphuncles composed of short folded back septal necks and generally thin connecting rings with swollen bullettes and which contain internal linings. (Flower & Teichert 1957; Teichert 1964)

Description
Winnipegoceras, named by Foerste (1922) for fossils found near Winnipeg in Manitoba, Canada, is known by it large, slender, compressed, strongly curved exogastric shells; long slender body chamber and siphuncle that is slightly removed from the venter which is the outer, longitudinally convex margin. Siphuncle segments are strongly narrowed at the septal foremina, bullettes swollen, parietal and other internal deposits rarely preserved. (ibid)

See also
 List of nautiloids

References

 Flower, R.H.and Curt Teichert 1957. The Cephalopod Order Discosorida. University of Kansas Paleontological Contributions, Mollusca, Article 6. July 1957
 Teichert, C 1964. Nautiloidea -Discosorida. Treatise on Invertebrate Paleontology Part K(3), R.C.Moore (ed), Univ.Kans.press.
 Sepkoski, J.J. Jr. 2002. A compendium of fossil marine animal genera. Sepkoski's Online Genus Database (CEPHALOPODA)

Discosorida
Middle Ordovician first appearances
Late Ordovician extinctions
Ordovician cephalopods
Paleozoic life of Manitoba
Paleozoic life of the Northwest Territories
Paleozoic life of Nunavut
Paleozoic life of Quebec
Prehistoric nautiloid genera